Stadt auf Stelzen is a 1965 West German black-and-white TV movie directed by Wolfgang Petersen. It is a recording of a play in Hamburg's Lessing Theatre for the NDR.

Cast
 Mathias Grimm
 Maria Hansen
 Helmut Heckelmann
 Barbara Kuhn
 Horst Uhde
 Timo Wüllner

References

External links
 

Films directed by Wolfgang Petersen
German black-and-white films
German television films
West German films
Films shot in Hamburg
Norddeutscher Rundfunk
Filmed stage productions
1960s German-language films